Dennis Patrick Ziadie (1 October 1946 – 24 June 1986) was a Jamaican footballer who played in the NASL with the Boston Beacons in 1968, as well as the Jamaican national side. He is the father of fellow players Chris Ziadie, Nick Ziadie and Craig Ziadie.

Ziadie and fellow coach Winthorpe "Jackie" Bell were killed in a car accident in Guadalajara, Mexico, during the 1986 FIFA World Cup. An annual memorial football match is held in Florida in Ziadie's memory.

References

External links
NASL career stats

1946 births
1986 deaths
People from Saint James Parish, Jamaica
Jamaican footballers
Jamaican expatriate footballers
Jamaica international footballers
North American Soccer League (1968–1984) players
Boston Beacons players
Jamaican expatriate sportspeople in the United States
Expatriate soccer players in the United States
Association football midfielders
Road incident deaths in Mexico